Judith Guest (born March 29, 1936) is an American novelist and screenwriter. She was born in Detroit, Michigan and is the great-niece of Poet Laureate Edgar Guest (1881–1959). She is a recipient of the Janet Heidinger Kafka Prize.

Early life
Guest attended Detroit's Mumford High School in 1951. When her family moved to Royal Oak, she transferred to Royal Oak High School; she graduated in 1954. Guest then studied English and psychology at the University of Michigan. She was also a member of Sigma Kappa sorority. Guest graduated with a BA in education.

Career
Guest taught at a public school for several years before deciding to work full-time completing a novel.

Guest's first book, Ordinary People, published in 1976, was the basis of the 1980 film Ordinary People that won the Academy Award for Best Picture.
This novel and two others, Second Heaven (1982) and Errands (1997), are about adolescents forced to deal with crises in their families. Guest also wrote the screenplay for the 1987 film Rachel River.

Guest co-authored the mystery Killing Time in St. Cloud (1988) with novelist Rebecca Hill. Guest's most recent book, The Tarnished Eye (2004), is loosely based on a real unsolved crime in her native Michigan.

Personal life
Guest was married for nearly 50 years to her college sweetheart, businessman Larry LaVercombe (1936-2009). Guest, her three sons, and their families, reside in Edina, Minnesota.

Bibliography
Ordinary People (1976)
Second Heaven (1982)
Killing Time in St. Cloud (with Rebecca Hill) (1988)
The Mythic Family (essay) (1988)
Errands (1997)
The Tarnished Eye (2004)

References

External links
Official website
2004 Judith Guest interview secretsofthecity.com

Judith Guest is interviewed by Sharon Charles of Hennepin County Library, Northern Lights Minnesota Author Interview TV Series #32 (1988)   

1936 births
Writers from Detroit
20th-century American novelists
21st-century American novelists
American women novelists
Living people
Novelists from Michigan
Novelists from Minnesota
University of Michigan School of Education alumni
American women screenwriters
20th-century American women writers
21st-century American women writers
Screenwriters from Michigan
Screenwriters from Minnesota
Mumford High School alumni